Sven Ohlsson may refer to:

 Sven Ohlsson (footballer) (1888-1947), Swedish Olympic footballer
 Sven Ohlsson (wrestler) (1886-1961), Swedish Olympic wrestler

See also
 Sven Olsson (1889-1919), Swedish Olympic footballer